The Cinémathèque Française, founded in 1936, is a French non-profit film organization that holds one of the largest archives of film documents and film-related objects in the world. Based in Paris's 12th arrondissement, the archive offers daily screenings of worldwide films.

History

The collection emerged from the efforts of Henri Langlois and Lotte H. Eisner in the mid 1930s to collect and screen films. Langlois had acquired one of the largest collections in the world by the beginning of World War II, only to have it nearly wiped out by the German authorities in occupied France, who ordered the destruction of all films made prior to 1937. He and his friends smuggled huge numbers of documents and films out of occupied France to protect them until the end of the war.

After the war, the French government provided a small screening room, staff and subsidy for the collection, which was relocated to the Avenue de Messine. Significant French filmmakers of the 1940s and 1950s, including Robert Bresson, René Clément, Henri-Georges Clouzot and Jacques Becker frequented screenings at the Cinémathèque. Directors of the New Wave (la Nouvelle Vague) school — Alain Resnais, Jacques Rivette, François Truffaut, Jean-Luc Godard, Claude Chabrol, Roger Vadim, Jacques Doniol-Valcroze, and Pierre Kast — also received much of their film education by attending the collection's screenings.

A meeting in 1945 in Basle between Langlois and Freddy Buache led, via Lausanne's first film club, to the founding in 1950 of the Swiss Film Archive.

The events of May 1968

In June 1963, the Cinémathèque moved to the Palais de Chaillot with funds provided by André Malraux, Minister of Culture, and became subject to government overview. In February 1968, under pressure from the Ministry of Finance, Malraux required changes in the management of the Cinémathèque and dismissed Henri Langlois.

A defence committee was formed, uniting notable French filmmakers (Alexandre Astruc, Claude Berri, Robert Bresson, Claude Chabrol, Jacques Doniol-Valcroze, Jean Eustache, Georges Franju, Abel Gance, Jean-Luc Godard, Joris Ivens, Pierre Kast, Chris Marker, Alain Resnais, Jacques Rivette, Eric Rohmer, Jean Rouch, François Truffaut) together with major actors (Jean-Pierre Léaud, Claude Jade, Jean Marais and Françoise Rosay). Foreign filmmakers such as Charles Chaplin and Stanley Kubrick added their support. Protests were organized.

Confrontations followed between young people, largely students, and what they saw as an authoritarian centre-right government, out of touch with the concerns of the younger generation. These demonstrations were precursors of and merged into the widespread student revolt that erupted from March 1968 onwards, escalating into nationwide unrest in May. Before then, the government had backed down over the Cinémathèque, reinstating Langlois as head in April 1968.

Location

After numerous incidentsincluding multiple relocations from one small screening room to another through the 1950s and a fire in its last premisesthe Cinémathèque française moved to 51, rue de Bercy in the 12th arrondissement of Paris and reopened its doors in a postmodern building designed by Frank Gehry, an American architect.

The Bibliothèque du film, which was created in 1992 to show the history of cinema, its production, impact and artistic strength, merged with the Cinémathèque française.

Cinémathèque française operates the Musée de la cinémathèque, formerly known as Musée du cinéma Henri-Langlois, in the new building.

President Director and Secretary

President: Costa-Gavras, Oscar-nominated director of Z, "State of Siege", Berlin Golden Bear-winning director of Music Box and Cannes Golden Palm-winning director of Missing
Director: Fréderic Bonnaud, former critic and radio host.
General Secretary: Jean-Michel Arnold, the spiritual successor of Henri Langlois and consistently re-elected as General Secretary since 1981
Honorary Presidents:
Claude Berri
Jean-Charles Tacchella

Tributes
In celebration of the Centennial of the Metropolitan Museum of Art, the Museum and the City Center of Music and Drama in New York co-sponsored "Cinémathèque at the Metropolitan Museum". The exhibition showed seventy films dating from the medium's first seventy-five years on thirty-five consecutive evenings from July 29 to September 3, 1970. The films were selected by Henri Langlois for their significance and contributions to the history of filmmaking, including work from official film industries as well as current and early avant garde directors.

The Cinémathèque's closing is noted in François Truffaut's 1968 film Stolen Kisses. The Cinémathèque also appears in the Paul Auster 2002 novel The Book of Illusions and the 1998 Harvey Danger song "Private Helicopter".

The Cinémathèque and the events surrounding the dismissal of Langlois in 1968 features heavily in Gilbert Adair's 1988 novel The Holy Innocents also known as The Dreamers and in its 2003 film adaptation by Bernardo Bertolucci.

See also
Cinematheque
The International Federation of Film Archives
List of film archives
Association des Cinémathèques Européennes - ACE (Association of European Cinematheques)

References

Further reading
 Grenier, Cynthia (Feb. 13, 2004). Langlois' film world seen with rose colors The Washington Times.
 Roud, Richard (1983) A Passion for Films: Henri Langlois and the Cinémathèque Française, London: Secker and Warburg; New York: Viking Press .
 Finding aid for the George Trescher records related to The Metropolitan Museum of Art Centennial, 1949, 1960-1971 (bulk 1967-1970). The Metropolitan Museum of Art. Retrieved 8 August 2014.

External links
Official site
The restaurant site
Cinémathèque Française Laterna magica site
CineSceneSF Blog - The Pied Piper of the Cinematheque

Museums in Paris
Frank Gehry buildings
Expressionist architecture
Postmodern architecture
Film archives in France
Film preservation
Film organizations in France
1936 establishments in France
Organizations established in 1936
Buildings and structures in the 12th arrondissement of Paris